The 2012 Trofeul Popeci was a professional tennis tournament played on outdoor clay courts. It was part of the 2012 ITF Women's Circuit. It took place in Craiova, Romania between 11 and 17 June 2012. This 6th edition of the Popeci Trophy saw its prize money rise from US$25,000 to US$50,000+H.

WTA entrants

Seeds

 Rankings are as of May 28, 2012.

Other entrants
The following players received wildcards into the singles main draw:
  Camelia Hristea
  Diana Marcu
  Ioana Loredana Roșca
  Ana Mihaela Vlăduțu

The following players received entry from the qualifying draw:
  Cristina Adamescu
  Indire Akiki
  Andrea Gámiz
  Paula Kania

The following player received entry from a special exempt spot:
  María-Teresa Torró-Flor

Champions

Singles

 María-Teresa Torró-Flor def.  Cristina Mitu, 6–3, 6–4

Doubles

 Renata Voráčová /  Lenka Wienerová def.  Paula Kania /  Irina Khromacheva, 2–6, 6–3, [10–6]

References

External links
Official website
ITF website

Trofeul Popeci
Trof
Trofeul Popeci
June 2012 sports events in Romania